is a city located in Ōita Prefecture, Japan at the tip of Kunisaki Peninsula in northern Kyushu.

Notable for the Usa Jingū, the head shrine of all 40,000 Hachiman shrines across Japan, the city annually attracts as many as 1.8 million worshipers from all over the country on New Year's Day. There are other tourist attractions in the city, such as the temple of Hongan-ji Betsuin, making it one of the prefecture's leading tourist cities.

As of March 2017, the city has an estimated population of 55,534 and a population density of 130 persons per km². The total area is 439.12 km².

History 
The town of Usa became a city on April 1, 1967. On March 31, 2005, the towns of Ajimu and Innai (both from Usa District) were merged into Usa.

Geography
Usa is located at the tip of the Kunisaki Peninsula in northern Kyushu.

Usa is made up of three areas.
Usa, the area surrounding the Usa Jingū (also known as the Usa Shrine)
Yokkaichi, the area surrounding the Hongan-ji temple, and an administrative town from the Edo Period
Nagasu, a port area

Climate
Usa has a humid subtropical climate (Köppen climate classification Cfa) with hot summers and cool winters. Precipitation is significant throughout the year, but is somewhat lower in winter.

Demographics
Per Japanese census data, the population of Usa in 2020 is 52,771 people. Usa has been conducting censuses since 1950.

Tourism

Attractions
Futaba no Sato, a museum dedicated to sumo wrestler Futabayama Sadaji, is located in the city. There is a statue outside the museum, built by the government in 1999, depicting the names and hand prints of three sumo wrestlers who have won more than 60 competitive bouts. In addition to Futubayama, Tanikaze Kajinosuke and Hakuhō Shō are represented on the statue.

Usa Jingū is situated in the city, and attracts as many as 1.8 million visitors annually. Nearby is the Ōita Prefectural Museum of History.

Anecdotes

Product labeling
There have been claims that products made in this town and exported to the US as early as the 1930s carried the label "MADE IN USA", for it to appear as if the product was made in the United States. There are reports that the name of the town was changed to "USA" for this purpose. The aforementioned claims are false. The city had this name long before the 1960s. Usa is a city and products must be labeled by country of origin, making it highly improbable that this would be an adequate loophole. In addition, any products being imported to the U.S. marked as being "made in USA" would have been flagged.

Notable people
Futabayama Sadaji, 35th yokozuna in sumo

References

External links

 Usa City official website 

Cities in Ōita Prefecture